James "Speedy" Williams is a streetball basketball player from the Bronx, NY who has been called a "Rucker Park legend".  He attended Morris High School in the Bronx. He played at Medgar Evers College  where he averaged 26 points per game, later going on to play with the Harlem Globetrotters and the Continental Basketball Association.  He played 10 seasons with the United States Basketball League and the Harlem Wizards.

He served as an advisor and played a role in the film Above The Rim.  It was alleged that he along with Kerry Thompson made a big living playing in drug money sponsored basketball games.

Notable wins
Williams was the winner in the March to the Garden Tournament and the 1 on 1 tournament winner at Madison Square Garden.

References

External links

Living people
Year of birth missing (living people)
Sportspeople from the Bronx
Basketball players from New York City
Medgar Evers College alumni
Harlem Globetrotters players
United States Basketball League players